The Rue des Martyrs is a street that passes through the 9th and 18th arrondissements of Paris, France.

The street is an old historic route in Pigalle leading up to the village of Montmartre, linking the church of Notre-Dame-de-Lorette with Sacré-Cœur. It is lined with around 200 shops and restaurants.

The name derives from the first bishop of Paris and patron saint of Paris, Saint Denis, who was decapitated during the time of the Roman Empire in the 3rd century. He travelled on this road and died close to where the Basilica of Saint-Denis was founded subsequently.

The Circus Medrano (originally called Cirque Fernando) was a circus located at 63 Boulevard de Rochechouart, at the corner with rue des Martyrs in the 18th arrondissement at the edge of Montmartre.

References

Further reading
 The Only Street in Paris: Life on the Rue des Martyrs by Elaine Sciolino. W.W. Norton & Company, 2015. .

External links

Streets in the 9th arrondissement of Paris
Streets in the 18th arrondissement of Paris